Argyrochosma limitanea, the southwestern false cloak fern, is a species of fern native to the southwestern United States and Sonora, Mexico. It grows on calcareous rocks, and has small, finely-divided leaves with a leathery texture, dark axes connecting the leaf segments, and a heavy coating of white powder on the undersurface. It reproduces apogamously; two subspecies are recognized, which may have originated independently through the hybridization of other taxa not yet discovered. First described as a species in 1919, it was transferred to the new genus Argyrochosma (the "false cloak ferns") in 1987, recognizing their distinctness from the "cloak ferns" (Notholaena sensu stricto).

Description
The rhizome is short and horizontal, with leaves closely spaced. It bears thin linear to lanceolate brown to reddish-brown or chestnut-brown scales, of a uniform color and with entire (toothless) margins.

The stipe (the stalk of the leaf, below the blade) is reddish-brown to black, rounded, without hairs or scales, except that a few scales like those of the rhizome may be present at the very base. They vary from narrowly to broadly deltate (triangular) in shape, and ranges from tripinnate (cut into pinnae, pinnules and pinnulets) to pentapinnate at the base, where it is most divided. The rachis (leaf axis) is rounded or slightly flattened and hairless above, straight or slightly zig-zagging,  and dark in color, as are the axes of the leaf segments. The color continues into the base of the leaf segments, without a distinct joint. From 6 to 12 pairs of pinnae are present, gradually narrowing at their tips and generally widest at their bases. Leaf segments are numerous and closely spaced, small, elliptic to ovate or roundish to oblong in shape. The leaf tissue has a leathery texture, obscuring the veins from the upper surface, and does not bear hairs or scales on either surface. The underside of the leaf has a thick covering of white farina (powder). The leaves and axes curl upward when dry.

In fertile leaf segments, the sporangia are close to the margin, borne along the further half of the secondary veins branching from the midrib of the segment. Each sporangium contains 32 spores. The leaf segments are curled under, often concealing the sporangia. A. limitanea is an apogamous triploid, with a chromosome count of n = 2n = 81.

Two subspecies are recognized: the typical A. limiteana subsp. limiteana, and A. limiteana subsp. mexicana. A. limiteana subsp. limiteana has broader blades, broadly deltate-ovate in shape and more highly (4 to 5 times) divided at the base, with the lowest pinnae at least half the length of the entire leaf blade. A. limiteana subsp. limiteana has narrower blades, lanceolate to oblong in shape and less highly (3 to 4 times) divided at the base, with the lowest pinnae from one-third to one-quarter the length of the entire leaf blade.

A. limitanea can be distinguished from A. incana and A. delicatula by its lack of a joint at the bases of leaf segments, with the dark color of the axes passing into the segment bases. It is larger in all particulars than the closely related A. dealbata, with darker leaf axes and thicker leaf tissue.

Taxonomy

The species was first described in 1919 as Notholaena limitanea by William Ralph Maxon. The epithet limitanea presumably refers to its distribution along the border between the United States and Mexico; Maxon referred to it as the "Mexican Border plant" in distinguishing it from similar species. He also described N. limitanea subsp. mexicana, with narrower leaves and some other characters distinguishing it from typical material. Oliver Atkins Farwell lumped the latter into a broadly defined Notholaena nivea in 1931 as N. nivea var. mexicana.

Both Edwin Copeland and Charles Alfred Weatherby suggested in the 1940s that a group of ferns related to Notholaena nivea might represent a distinct genus of its own. Weatherby thought that, until that genus was described, the group might better be placed in Pellaea, rather than in Notholaena, but died in 1949 before he could circumscribe and publish it. Accordingly, in 1950, Conrad Vernon Morton transferred the species to Pellaea as P. limitanea, to provide a name for it in Thomas Henry Kearney's Flowering Plants and ferns of Arizona, and reduced the subspecies to a variety. John T. Mickel, following Copeland's opinion that Notholaena was best lumped into a broadly defined Cheilanthes, transferred the species there as C. limitanea in 1979, also treating the subspecies as a variety.

The recognition of the N. nivea group as a genus was finally addressed in 1987 by Michael D. Windham, who was carrying out phylogenetic studies of the cheilanthoids. He elevated Notholaena sect. Argyrochosma to become the genus Argyrochosma, and transferred this species to that genus as A. limitanea. He did not create a combination for N. limitanea subsp. mexicana at the time, but did so (at subspecific rank) in 1993. In 2018, Maarten J. M. Christenhusz transferred the species to Hemionitis as H. limitanea, as part of a program to consolidate the cheilanthoid ferns into that genus.

Phylogenetic studies have shown that A. limitanea is a sister species to A. dealbata, of the central and southern United States; these two species form a clade sister to another clade of several South American species. The two subspecies are genetically distinct, and believed to be of independent allopolyploid origin, through the hybridization of sexual taxa not yet discovered. More than one cryptic allopolyploid taxon may be included within the present circumscription of A. limitanea subsp. limitanea.

Distribution and habitat
Argyrochosma limitanea is known in the United States from San Bernardino County, California, east through Arizona, New Mexico, southern Utah, and Trans-Pecos Texas, and south into northern Mexico, extending as far southeast as Hidalgo. A. limitanea subsp. limitanea ranges from California through Utah and into Mexico only in Sonora and Chihuahua. A. limitanea subsp. mexicana has a more easterly range, from Arizona through Texas and in Mexico from Chihuahua and Sinaloa east.

Both subspecies grow on rocky slopes and cliffs, composed of either calcareous or volcanic rocks, although A. limitanea subsp. mexicana shows a greater preference for calcareous substrates in Mexico.

Conservation
Under the NatureServe conservation status system, A. limitanea is ranked as apparently secure (G4), but it is considered imperiled in Texas.

Notes and references

References

Works cited

External links
Holotype of the species at JSTOR Plant Science.
Isotype of Argyrochosma limitanea subsp. mexicana at JSTOR Plant Science.
Jepson Manual eFlora (TJM2) treatment of Argyrochosma limitanea subsp. limitanea
UC Photos gallery — Argyrochosma limitanea

limitanea
Ferns of California
Ferns of Mexico
Ferns of the United States
Flora of the Southwestern United States
Flora of the California desert regions
Natural history of the Mojave Desert
Flora of the Sonoran Deserts
Plants described in 1919